Olusegun Kokumo Agagu (16 February 1948 – 13 September 2013) was a Nigerian politician who was governor of Ondo State in Nigeria from 29 May 2003 until February 2009, when a court voided his re-election as governor on account of electoral irregularities. He was replaced as governor by Olusegun Mimiko, his political rival, based on a court injunction. He was a member of the then ruling Peoples Democratic Party (PDP).

Educational background

He commenced his elementary education at St. Luke’s Anglican School, (now known as St. Paul’s Anglican School) Okitipupa, in 1954. In January 1958, he moved to live with his cousin, Edward Fagbohun in Ibadan, where he continued his primary education at Ebenezer African Church School, Oke-Ado, Ibadan. In 1959 he transferred to Kano in 1959 where he studied at the Ebenezer Methodist School and Baptist Primary School Sabon-Gari, Kano. 

He then moved back to Ebenezer African Church School, Ibadan where he completed his primary education in 1960. Thereafter, he was in Ibadan Grammar School between January 1961 and 1967 where he passed his West African School Certificate and the Higher School Certificate examinations. He was admitted to the University of Ibadan in 1968 to study Botany but later changed to Geology in which he graduated with a B.Sc. (Hons) degree in Second Class Upper Division, in 1971.

Agagu went to the University of Texas between 1973 and 1974 for his master's degree in Geology. Returning to Nigeria, he obtained a Ph.D degree in Petroleum Geology from the University of Ibadan in 1978.

Career
He was elected Deputy Governor of Ondo State, Nigeria from January 1992 to November 1993 during the Nigerian Third Republic, elected on the Social Democratic Party (SDP) platform. As the Deputy Governor in Ondo State, the combination of his knowledge as a Geologist, resourcefulness and his untiring efforts led to the State becoming an oil-producing state, a feat that massively expanded the economic base of the State. He was forced to leave office when the military regime of general Sani Abacha took power.

Agagu was appointed by President Olusegun Obasanjo as his first Minister of Aviation in 1999. and then as Minister for Power and Steel (2000-2002).

Once, while on a foreign trip, the people of Ondo received false reports of his death.

On 29 June 2006 President Olusegun Obasanjo commended him for the work he had done leading Ondo State, saying "You have taken time to plan. We have also seen that the execution of the plan is now showing results."

In September 2008 a Senate Ad-Hoc Committee investigating the Transportation Sector summoned Agagu and others as part of its probe of the entire transportation sector, to answer questions about his tenure as Minister of Aviation.

Death
He reportedly slumped and died on September 13, 2013 in Lagos.

On 3 October 2013, a day before his burial, Associated Aviation Flight 361, the plane carrying his corpse together with 13 passengers and 7 crew members, crashed on takeoff from Murtala Muhammed International Airport.

References

1948 births
2013 deaths
Politicians from Ondo State
Yoruba politicians
Governors of Ondo State
Peoples Democratic Party state governors of Nigeria
Aviation ministers of Nigeria
Federal ministers of Nigeria
University of Ibadan alumni
University of Texas alumni
Burials in Ondo State
Ibadan Grammar School alumni